The 2016–17 UT Martin Skyhawks women's basketball team represented University of Tennessee at Martin during the 2016–17 NCAA Division I women's basketball season. The Skyhawks, led by eighth year head coach Kevin McMillan, played their home games at Skyhawk Arena as members of the Ohio Valley Conference (OVC). The team finished the season with a 12–19 overall, 8–8 OVC record in a fourth-place tie.

Schedule and results

|-
!colspan=9 style=| Non–conference regular season

|-
!colspan=9 style=| Ohio Valley Conference regular season

|-
!colspan=9 style=| Ohio Valley Conference tournament

References

UT Martin Skyhawks women's basketball seasons
Tennessee-Martin